Anna Radziwiłłówna (1475 or 1476 – 15 March 1522) was a Lithuanian noble woman and Duchess of Masovia.

She was the daughter of Mikołaj Radziwiłł and his first wife, Zofia Moniwidówna. She was born in 1475 or 1476.

Anna was married to Konrad III Rudy of the Masovian Piast Dynasty between 29 September 1496 and 2 April 1497.

She died on the night of 14/15 March 1522. She was buried in the cloister of Bernardin's in Warsaw.

She is one of the characters on the famous painting by Jan Matejko, Prussian Homage.

References

1476 births
1522 deaths
Anna Radziwill (nobility)
15th-century Polish women